Several mission societies, including the Baptist Missionary Society, SPCK, LMS, Basel Mission, CMS, SPG, Zenana mission, Medical Mission, American Mission, Danish Mission, and Methodist Mission missionaries have contributed for the progressive Christian community in India. These missionaries have made a vast contributions in the districts of Tinnevelly and Travancore, which covers most of the southern Tamil Nadu. These missions were mostly influenced under the direct control of the Church of England.

The following is an incomplete list of Protestant missionaries in India.

Missionaries 
 Rev. John Anderson - Missionary from Church of Scotland - Founder - Madras Christian College
 Elizabeth Baring-Gould
 Rev. B. Baring-Gould - CMS Missionary
 Rev. Graham Basanti - women missionary at Jeypore Evangelical Lutheran Church 
 Rev. James Kershaw Best - SPG missionary at Christianagaram
 Paul Olaf Bodding
 Paul Wilson Brand
 Miss Kathleen Nora Brockway - Founder of St. Christopher's College of Education, Chennai
 Edith Mary Brown
 Nathan Brown
 Rev. Augustus Frederick Caemmerer - SPG missionary
 Ann Caemmerer - Started the first Girls High School in South India - St. Johns Girls High School, Nazareth - Daughter of Rev. Charles Mead - and Wife of Rev. A.F. Caemmerer
 Robert Caldwell
 Eliza Caldwell - Wife of Robert Caldwell, and Daughter of Rev. Charles Mault
 William Carey
 Amy Carmichael
 Rev. Robert Carver - Methodist Missionary
  Alexander Crawford - first Presbyterian missionary to India (1823–29)
 Alexander Duff
 Rev. James Duthie - LMS Missionary to Travancore
 Rt. Rev. James Edward Lesslie Newbigin - Ordained in Church of Scotland; affiliated with the United Reformed Church; served in the Church of South India
 Abraham Friesen & Maria Friesen - Mennonite Brethren Missionary from South Russia in Nalgonda, Hyderabad State.
 Christian William Gericke - S.P.C.K. Missionar
  James Glasgow (1805–90) - early missionary from the Presbyterian Church in Ireland (1841-1864)
 Anthony Norris Groves
 Johann Ernst Gründler
 Rev. Dr. Hermann Gundert - German linguist and Basel missionary to India
 John Christian Frederick Heyer
 Sam Higginbottom
 John Nelson Hyde
 Lyman Jewett
 E. Stanley Jones
 Rev. James F. Kearns - Missionary at Puthiamputhur
 Samuel H. Kellogg - translator of Hindi Bible
  Alexander Kerr - early missionary from the Presbyterian Church in Ireland (1841)
 Rev. Draviam Koilpillai - Headmaster of St. Aidan's College at Natal (S. Africa), Military Chaplain at Mesapotamia, & a friend of M.K. Gandhi - Missionary at Nazareth
 Rev. Dr. Eugen Liebendörfer - German physician and Basel missionary to India
 James Long - Church Missionary Society missionary
 Joshua Marshman
 Henry Martyn - Church Missionary Society missionary
 Rev. Charles Mead - LMS Missionary to Travancore
 Rev Charles Mault - LMS Missionary to Travancore
 Rev. Arthur Margoschis - Nazareth, Tamil Nadu - SPG missionary
 Rev. Murdoch Mackenzie - originally from the Congregational Church; ordained in the Church of South India 
 Rev. Volbrecht Nagel - German missionary to India
 George Pieritz - SPG missionary
 Jessie Kelp (later Jessie Pigott) in Allahabad and Delhi (1887-9)
 Rev. Luke Rivington - Missionary at Edeyengoody
 Ida S. Scudder
 Lars Olsen Skrefsrud
 Graham Staines
 Alfred Sturge
 Rev. Ellis O. Shaw - from the Church of Scotland; served in the Church of South India
 Rev. Dr. J.M. Strachan - Medical Mission at Nazareth, Tamil Nadu - SPG missionary - Bishop of Rangoon
 Rev. John Alfred Sharrock - SPG missionary
 Ralph T. Templin
 Rev. Adam Compton Thomson - SPG missionary
 Rev. Simeon Wilberforce O'Neill
 Rev. Henry Constantine Huxtable - SPG missionary at Sawyerpuram and Christianagaram
 Rev. Christian Samuel Kohloff  - SPG missionary at Christianagaram
 Rev. H. B. Norman - SPG missionary at Mudalur
 Rev. James Hough - Chaplain of Palamcottah - Honourable East India Company
 Rev. John Thomas - C.M.S. Missionary of Prakasapuram and Mengnanapuram - called as Apostle of South Tirunelveli
 Rev. Schaffter - C.M.S. Missionary
 Sarah Tucker - C.M.S. Missionary
 Rev. John Thomas Tucker - C.M.S. Missionary at Paneivilei, Tinnevelly
 Thomas Gajetan Ragland - C.M.S. Missionary at North Tinnevelly
 Rev. William Tobias Ringeltaube - LMS Missionary to Travancore
 J.T. Margoschis - SPG Missionary - Principal - SPG High School - Trichinopoly
 Reginald Heber - Bishop of Calcutta
 Christian Friedrich Schwarz - German S.P.C.K. Missionary
 Joseph Daniel Jaenicke - German S.P.C.K. Missionary
 Dr. Christopher Samuel John - Danish Mission
 John Caspar Kohlhoff - S.P.C.K. Missionary
 Dr. C.S. Shelton - American Madura Mission
 Dr. Steele - American Madura Mission
 Rev. William Miller - Missionary from Church of Scotland - Madras Christian College
 Lady White - Methodist Missionary
 Miss Katie Wilcox - American Board of Congregational Churches - Founder of Lady Doak College, Madurai
 Miss Eleanor McDougall - Missionary Educator - Founder Principal of Women's Christian College - Madras
 George Trevor Spencer - Lord Bishop of Madras
 Donald McGavran
 V. Nagel
 J. Waskom Pickett
 George Uglow Pope
 Rev C. T. E. Rhenius - first Church Missionary Society missionary
 Rev. George Pettitt - Church Missionary Society missionary
 Bishop Edward Sargent - Church Missionary Society missionary
 Heinrich Plütschau
 Rev. Benjamin Schultze - Translated and printed Old Testament - Bible, in Tamil.
 Johann Fabricius - Translated and printed New Testament - Bible, in Tamil
 Rev. Dr. J. P. Rottler - Danish Mission
 Rev. Peter Percival - Wesleyan Methodist Mission
 Rev. David Rosen - Danish Missionary - Has worked at Nicobar Islands, Nazareth and Mudalur
 Rev. John Ludovick Irion - Netherland Missionary Society - Has worked at Nazareth and Mudalur
 Rev. Thomas Brotherton - Missionary at Tanjore, Madras, and Nazareth
 Rev. Carlin Wilfred Weston - Missionary at Nazareth
 Rev. Cecil George Stapley - Missionary at Nazareth
 Rev. Stephen Charles Neill - Nazareth Station - Bishop of Tinnevelly
 Rev. Charles Hubbard - First English Missionary employed by S.P.G. in Tinnevelly
 Mason Vaugh and Clara Pennington - Founder of Allahabad Agricultural Institute
 Elmer Whitcomb and Adella Rodeheffer - Founder of Evangelical Hospital, Tilda
 Harwood W Raw, 1871-1905 - Wesleyan Methodist Missionary Society served in Madras from 1896 until his premature death in 1905
 Rev. William Tobias Ringeltaube, (1770- ?) - London Missionary Society served in the then South Travancore, present revenue district of Kanyakumari in Tamil Nadu
 Dr. Boaz Kok Ph.D - Assemblies of God
 Rev. Robert Turlington Noble -  Founder of Noble College, Machilipatnam
 Hopestill Pillow - Zenana Missionary to India
 William Arthur Stanton - American Baptist Missionary in South Indian town of Kurnool of Andhra Pradesh.
 N N Hiebert - Mennonite Brethren Missionary from south Russia in Hyderabad State
 Elizabeth Neufeld -  Mennonite Brethren Missionary in Hyderabad
 Anna Suderman - Mennonite Brethren Missionary in Hyderabad
 John H. and Maria Pankratz - Mennonite Brethren Missionary in Hyderabad
 Rev. A. Brotherton Vickers - SPG missionary
 William Ward
 Rev. G.T. Washburn - American Madura Mission
 William Keith Whitcomb and Dorothy Vaugh - United Church Board for World Ministries
 Charlotte White - first unmarried American woman missionary
 H. U. Weitbrecht - Church Missionary Society missionary, author of "The Revision of the Urdu New Testament"
 Sister Joyce M. Woollard
 Rev. Joseph Light Wyatt - SPG missionary - Bishop Heber College
 Isabella Wyatt - Wife of Rev. J.L. Wyatt, and the eldest daughter of Robert Caldwell
 Bartholomäus Ziegenbalg

See also
 List of Roman Catholic missionaries in India
 Mission (Christian)
 Christianity in India

References

Further reading
 In the Shadow of the Mahatma: Bishop V. S. Azariah and the Travails of Christianity in British India by Susan Billington Harper

External links
 Mission India
 Joshua Project India
 Literary contributions of select list of Tamil scholars from overseas
 https://books.google.com/books?id=Xi-tvrYbYxMC&printsec=frontcover#v=onepage&q&f=false
 https://books.google.com/books?id=b9sHAAAAQAAJ&printsec=frontcover#v=onepage&q&f=false
 http://anglicanhistory.org/india/madras1897/

List
Missionaries
Protestant missionaries
India